Juventa Starachowice was a football club in Starachowice, Świętokrzyskie Voivodeship. Juventa Starachowice played in the III liga. They played home games at the Stadion Miejski. Previous to the establishment of the football club in 1996, the amateur sporting organisation also had an interest in tennis and athletics.

History
The club was founded on the initiative of a dozen supporters of sport and recreation and with the organisation and kindness of the Parish of Our Lady of Perpetual Help and the South Elementary School No. 13.

Since the beginning the club the organisation has set about shaping the attitudes and morals of the youth along with recreation and amateur sport. Initially, the club had a major interest in tennis and athletics, however in 1996 it was decided that a football team would be established which would be coached by Chris Zuba. Four years later (in 2000) sections in the club parted. Athletics remained in "Juvencie-Marbo" while the players created the Catholic Section of the Autonomous Sports Football Club, "Juventa" Starachowice.

At junior level the club had many successes, winning a number of tournaments however in 2005 it was decided to start a senior team which joined the Class A tournament under the name "Juventa-Star." This team was financially supported by a committee of "100". In the first season "Juventa-Star" won promotion to the class of the district, the top scorer of the A-Class won by local Konrad Tchurz.

Six months later, the band began performing under the name "Juventa" Starachowice, and after the season ended the main sponsor "Perfopol", notified to the competition that the club would be named "Juventa-Perfopol". In the 2007/08 season under the leadership of the first coach from "outside" Starachowice, the club won promotion to the fourth league.

Due to the reputation of then coach Arkadiusz Bilski, the club was able to sign many high-profile players including several with experience in a top-flight. In the first season in the third league Starachowice achieved seventh position in the table, and a year later took on a higher place.

With the end of the 2010/11 season the club resigned from the sponsoring company Perfopol, so the band returned to name "Juventa" Starachowice. A few rounds before the end of the competition coach Arkadiusz Bilski resigned and was replaced by Marek Mierzwa who previously worked for Spartacus Daleszyce. In November 2011, Mierzwa was replaced by former coach of KSZO Ostrowiec Św., Rafał Wójcik.

In the 2012–13 III liga season, the club took 10th place. In the next season – they were not entered for the competition.

Club honours
 2008 Promotion to IV Liga
 2009 Promotion in III Liga

References

External links
 Official website
 Juventa Starachowice at the 90minut.pl website (Polish)

Association football clubs established in 1996
1996 establishments in Poland
Multi-sport clubs in Poland
Football clubs in Świętokrzyskie Voivodeship
Starachowice County